Yuan Jing (born March 27, 1987 in Wuxi, Jiangsu) is a Chinese sport shooter. She won a gold medal in the women's sport pistol at the 2011 ISSF World Cup series in Munich, Germany, with a total score of 787.8 points, earning her a spot on the Chinese team for the Olympics.

Yuan represented China at the 2012 Summer Olympics in London, where she competed in the women's 25 m pistol, along with her teammate and defending Olympic champion Chen Ying. Yuan shot 288 targets in the precision stage, and 291 in the rapid-fire, for a total score of 579 points and a bonus of 18 inner tens, finishing only in twentieth place.

References

External links
NBC Olympics Profile

1987 births
Living people
Chinese female sport shooters
Olympic shooters of China
Shooters at the 2012 Summer Olympics
Sportspeople from Wuxi
Sport shooters from Jiangsu